Ekspedisi Madewa (Madewa's Expedition) is a 2006 Indonesian adventure film directed by Franklin Darmadi

Synopsis
In the film expedition expert, Tiro Mandawa - played by Tora Sudiro - accidentally discovers a mysterious artifact on one of his work assignments. He inadvertently unleashes a chain of events that lead to an adventure of a lifetime.

The mysterious artifact was believed to be the final missing link to an ancient Indonesian legend. Many believed that the artifact was the key to finding the ultimate source of unlimited power. This power if possessed by a righteous man, would revitalize the world for all eternity, but in the wrong hands would bring disaster and death.

Sponsored by the fictional conglomerate the Madewa Group Tiro embarks on a mission to uncover the truth about the legend. He is accompanied by his friend and loyal companion, Satrio - played by Arie Dagienkz.

Cast
Tora Sudiro
Indra Birowo
Arie Dagienkz
Marsha Timothy
Frans Tumbuan

External links
  Official Site
  Movie Clips @ YouTube.com

2006 films
2000s Indonesian-language films
2000s adventure films
Films shot in Indonesia
Indonesian adventure films